The 1976 Primera División season was the 85th season of top-flight football in Argentina. Boca Juniors won both tournaments, Metropolitano and Nacional, totaling 20 league titles until then. 

After three consecutive seasons with no relegations, San Telmo was relegated to Primera B after playing a small tournament with the worst placed teams in the general table.

Metropolitano Championship

Classification round

Group A

Group B

Championship Group

Relegation Group

Nacional Championship

Group A

1st place Playoff

14 December 1976
Boca Juniors 2-1 Quilmes

Group B

Group C

Group D

1st place Playoff

14 December 1976
Talleres de Córdoba 3-1 Newell's Old Boys

Quarterfinals
16 December 1976
Boca Juniors 2-1 Banfield
River Plate 2-1 Quilmes
Huracán 2-0 Newell's Old Boys
Talleres de Córdoba 4-0 Unión de Santa Fe

Semifinals
19 December 1976
Boca Juniors 1-0 Huracán
River Plate 1-0 Talleres de Córdoba

Final

References

Argentine Primera División seasons
p
p
Primera Division
Arg